John Fanning (22 October 1903 – 1 January 1982) was an Irish Fianna Fáil politician. A farmer, he was first elected to Dáil Éireann as a Fianna Fáil Teachta Dála (TD) for the Tipperary North constituency at the 1951 general election. He was re-elected at every subsequent general election until he retired from politics at the 1969 general election.

References

1903 births
1982 deaths
Fianna Fáil TDs
Members of the 14th Dáil
Members of the 15th Dáil
Members of the 16th Dáil
Members of the 17th Dáil
Members of the 18th Dáil
Irish farmers
Politicians from County Tipperary